Valla Sadya is a celebration in the Hindu temple at Aranmula, Kerala, India. During the festival, the village conducts a snake boat race in the Pampa River, and there is a feast at the temple. The Valla Sadhya is conducted on Ashtamirohoni day. During Valla Sadhya, Krishna, the main deity worshipped in the temple, will come to take the offerings from people. The legend is that in a Valla Sadya all dishes asked for must be given to the people in order to please the lord.

Common offerings
The  is a feast of vegetarian food of the ayurvedic tradition. Each meal consists of 10 to 20 dishes served on banana or plantain leaves, and up to 64 dishes on Ashtami Rohini Day, the birthday of Krishna. 

Some of the dishes and foods include: 
 Parippu - A thick lentil dish eaten with rice, papadum and ghee
Pulisserry - Curry prepared with thick and sour buttermilk
Banana chips
Shakara varatti and poovan palam
Aravana payasam. (Pudding made from rice, jaggery and ghee)
Kaalipazham payasam (Pudding made of banana)
Unniappam
 Sambar
 Rasam
 Aviyal
 Kaalan
 Olan
 Koottukari
 Kichadi
 Pachadi
 Injipuli
 Thoran
 Achar: Spicy pickled raw mango, lemon, or lime

Valla Sadhya

Valla sadya is conducted by the devotees as a "Vazhipadu" to Parthasarathy(another name for Krishna). The Valla sadya is dedicated to any of the boats. On the Valla sadya day, the oarsmen will come to the Temple in the boat through the river. The oarsmen offer Nirapara to the presiding deity at the Nadappanthal in front of the gold plated temple mast and go around the temple chanting Krishna bhajans (Vanchi pattu). The entire atmosphere is charged with the rhythmic Vanchi pattu, songs in praise of Parthasarathy. The `vallasadya' begins immediately after the uccha pooja (noon worship) at the temple. They circumambulate the temple, chanting the `vanchi pattu', verses in praise of Krishna, before partaking of the Valla sadya.

On the day of Krishna’s birthday – Ashtami Rohini day, the Valla sadya is conducted for all the devotees of Parthasarathy. Around 1 lakh people attend this event every year. Most of the palliodams attend this feast.

Events 
During the Kerala floods in 2018, the temple remained open for the celebration and 92 offerings were performed.

See also 
 Aranmula
 Palliyodam
 Snake boat
 Aranmula Boat Race

References

External links

 http://www.aranmula.net
 http://www.aranmulavallamkali.com
 https://www.templespedia.com/aranmula-vallasadya-dishes/

Hindu festivals in Kerala
Festivals in Pathanamthitta district
Aranmula